Herbert Kiper (1897–1978) was a German stage and film actor.

Selected filmography
 Dancer of Death (1920)
 Without Meyer, No Celebration is Complete (1931)
 Duty Is Duty (1931)
 Quartet of Five (1949)
 Heart of Stone (1950)
 The Call of the Sea (1951)
 All Clues Lead to Berlin (1952)
 The Uncle from America (1953)
 The Dancing Heart (1953)
 Knall and Fall as Detectives (1953)
 Josef the Chaste (1953)
 Carola Lamberti – Eine vom Zirkus (1954)
 Ball of Nations (1954)
 Wenn der Vater mit dem Sohne (1955)
 Swelling Melodies (1955)
 My Wife Makes Music (1958)

References

Bibliography
 Torsten Körner. Der kleine Mann als Star: Heinz Rühmann und seine Filme der 50er Jahre. Campus Verlag, 2001.

External links

1897 births
1978 deaths
German male film actors
German male stage actors
People from Wiesbaden
20th-century German male actors